Crème brûlée or crème brulée, also known as burnt cream or Trinity cream, and virtually identical to the original crema catalana, is a dessert consisting of a rich custard base topped with a layer of hardened caramelized sugar. It is normally served slightly chilled; the heat from the caramelizing process tends to warm the top of the custard, while leaving the center cool.
The custard base is traditionally flavored with vanilla in French cuisine, but can have other flavorings. It is sometimes garnished with fruit.

History
The earliest known recipe of a dessert called crème brûlée appears in François Massialot's 1691 cookbook . The question of its origin has inspired debate within the modern gastronomical community, with some authors suggesting that crema catalana, whose origins date to the 14th century, may have inspired chefs throughout Europe. 

Some authors mention Bartolomeo Stefani's Latte alla Spagnuola (1662) as describing crema catalana, but it calls for browning the top of the custard before serving with sugar on top.

The name "burnt cream" was later used to refer to the dish in the 1702 English translation of Massialot's . In 1740, he referred to a similar recipe as crême à l'Angloise, or 'English cream', which further cast doubt on its origins. The dessert was introduced at Trinity College, Cambridge in 1879 as "Trinity Cream" or "Cambridge burnt cream", with the college arms "impressed on top of the cream with a branding iron". No dessert by the name crème brûlée appeared again in French cookbooks until the 1980s.

Crème brûlée was generally uncommon in both French and English cookbooks of the nineteenth and twentieth centuries. It became extremely popular in the 1980s, "a symbol of that decade's self-indulgence and the darling of the restaurant boom", probably popularized by Sirio Maccioni at his New York restaurant Le Cirque. He claimed to have made it "the most famous and by far the most popular dessert in restaurants from Paris to Peoria".

Technique
Crème brûlée is usually served in individual ramekins. Discs of caramel may be prepared separately and put on top just before serving, or the caramel may be formed directly on top of the custard immediately before serving. To do this, sugar is sprinkled onto the custard, then caramelized under a red-hot salamander (a cast-iron disk with a long wooden handle) or with a butane torch.

There are two methods for making the custard. The more common creates a "hot" custard by whisking egg yolks in a double boiler with sugar and incorporating the cream, adding vanilla once the custard is removed from the heat. Alternatively, the egg yolk/sugar mixture can be tempered with hot cream, then adding vanilla at the end. In the "cold" method, the egg yolks and sugar are whisked together until the mixture reaches the ribbon stage. Then, cold heavy cream is whisked into the yolk mixture, followed by the vanilla. It is then poured into ramekins and baked in a bain-marie.

See also

 Crème caramel, also known as flan (not to be confused with the English flan)
 List of custard desserts
 List of French desserts

Citations

General and cited references

External links
 

Custard desserts
French desserts
British desserts
Spanish desserts